Scrobipalpa tokari is a moth in the family Gelechiidae. It was described by Peter Huemer and Ole Karsholt in 2010. It is found in Croatia and Russia.

Etymology
The species name is dedicated to Zdenko Tokár, who collected the type series and made important contributions to European lepidopterology.

References

Scrobipalpa
Moths described in 2010